Vander L. Beatty (February 5, 1941 – August 30, 1990) was an American politician from New York.

Life
Beatty was a member of the New York State Assembly (54th D.) in 1971 and 1972; and a member of the New York State Senate from 1973 to 1982, sitting in the 180th, 181st, 182nd, 183rd and 184th New York State Legislatures.

In 1982, he ran in the Democratic primary for Congress in the 12th District, but was defeated by Major Owens. Beatty then attempted to defraud the results of the primary, and was eventually convicted and sentenced to jail.

Death 
Beatty was murdered on August 30, 1990, at his campaign headquarters in Brooklyn while attempting a political come-back. The murder allegedly occurred after a judge refused to reduce Everett Flournoy’s alimony and child support payments. Flournoy was represented at the hearing by a lawyer recommended by Beatty. Flournoy was apprehended after two appearances on the television program "America's Most Wanted".

References

1941 births
1990 deaths
Members of the New York State Assembly
New York (state) state senators
Politicians from Brooklyn
20th-century American politicians